Howard Taylor (5 April 1908 – 30 December 1985) was an English cricketer who made three first-class cricket appearances for Kent County Cricket Club in 1937.

Taylor was born at Charlton in the London Borough of Greenwich in 1908 and educated at Mill Hill School. He captained the school cricket XI and played for 'The Rest' against the major Public Schools at Lord's in 1925 and for the Public Schools against the touring Australians in 1926. He was considered one of the best schoolboy cricketers in his age group.

Taylor made his first-class debut for Kent against Yorkshire in June 1937, making a pair on debut but taking the wicket of Herbert Sutcliffe. He made another two first-class appearances for the county later in the month. He played cricket during the Second World War for Civil Defence sides and made a final appearance for a non-first-class Kent side in July 1945.

In club cricket Taylor played for Blackheath Cricket Club in the Kent League, captaining the side in the years after the Second World War. By profession he was a stockbroker and lived in Henley-upon-Thames. He died at Tunbridge Wells in Kent in December 1985 aged 77.

References

External links

1908 births
1985 deaths
People from Charlton, London
English cricketers
Kent cricketers